The 1920 Nebraska gubernatorial election was held on November 2, 1920, and featured incumbent Governor Samuel R. McKelvie, a Republican, defeating Democratic nominee, former Governor John H. Morehead, and progressive-backed independent candidate, York Mayor Arthur G. Wray, to win a second and final two-year term in office.

Democratic primary

Candidates
Ralph A. Clark
George W. Jackson, Speaker of the state House of Representatives
John H. Morehead, former Governor
G. L. Shumway, former Commissioner of Public Lands and Buildings
William J. Taylor, state Senator

Results

Republican primary

Candidates
Thomas L. Hall, Commissioner of the state Railway Commission
George D. Mathewson, state Representative
Samuel R. McKelvie, incumbent Governor
Harry J. McLaughlin, state Representative
Adam McMullen, state Senator and former Mayor of Wymore
Ernest M. Pollard, former U.S. Representative

Results

General election

Results

References

Gubernatorial
1920
Nebraska